Gregory Mertens (2 February 1991 – 30 April 2015) was a Belgian professional football player. His usual position was central defender. He last played for Lokeren.

Career
Mertens moved from the reserves of K.A.A. Gent to the first team of Cercle Brugge in the 2010–11 winter transfer window, at the recommendation of manager Bob Peeters, who had been his coach at the Gent reserves the previous season.

On 12 February 2011, Mertens made his senior debut for Cercle as an 89th-minute substitute for Hans Cornelis in a match against his former team R.S.C. Anderlecht. Cercle lost the match 1–0.

On 23 May 2013, he scored his first hat trick against WS Woluwe.

Death

Mertens suffered a cardiac arrest during a reserve game for Lokeren against K.R.C. Genk on 27 April 2015. He was immediately taken to hospital where he was put in an artificially induced coma. He died on 30 April 2015 at around 16:30. Lokeren declared that Mertens had passed all fitness tests set by UEFA, and therefore the cause of his cardiac arrest needed to be established.

On the day after his death, Lokeren lined up for their play-off match against Westerlo in T-shirts bearing Mertens' name and squad number 4.

Honours
Lokeren
Belgian Cup: 2013–14

See also
List of association footballers who died while playing
 List of association footballers who died during their careers

References

External links
 
 Gregory Mertens player info at the official Cercle Brugge site 
 Cerclemuseum.be 
 

1991 births
2015 deaths
Belgian footballers
Association football defenders
Belgian Pro League players
People from Anderlecht
R.S.C. Anderlecht players
K.A.A. Gent players
Cercle Brugge K.S.V. players
K.S.C. Lokeren Oost-Vlaanderen players
Belgium youth international footballers
Belgium under-21 international footballers
Association football players who died while playing
Sport deaths in Belgium
Footballers from Brussels